Mauno Rintanen (28 April 1925 – 13 July 2000) was a Finnish footballer. He played in seven matches for the Finland national football team from 1946 to 1954. He was also part of Finland's team at the 1952 Summer Olympics, and for their qualification matches for the 1954 FIFA World Cup.

He started his career at VPS before moving to HJK. In 1956 he became first ever Finnish footballer to play in English Football League when he signed an amateur contract for Hull City A.F.C. He made his debut in 17 October 1956 in a match against Bradford Park Avenue.

References

External links
 

1925 births
2000 deaths
Finnish footballers
Finland international footballers
Place of birth missing
Association football goalkeepers